Alego may refer to:

South East Alego electoral ward of Siaya County Council, Kenya
Alego Constituency (Alego Usonga Constituency), one of the Constituencies of Kenya
South East Alego, an administrative location in Karemo division of Siaya County